Daut Musekwa (born 1 April 1988) is a Zambian footballer who plays for ZESCO United F.C.

Honours 
ZESCO United
Winner
 Zambian Premier League (2): 2014, 2015

Runner-up
 Zambian Premier League: 2013

External links 
 

1988 births
Living people
Zambian footballers
Zambia international footballers
Association football defenders
ZESCO United F.C. players
Zambia A' international footballers
2016 African Nations Championship players